The Good Evening Europe Tour was a concert tour by Paul McCartney in Europe. The tour began on 2 December 2009, at the Color Line Arena in Hamburg, Germany, and concluded on 22 December 2009, at The O2 in London.

Background
The tour followed McCartney's summer tour of the United States, Summer Live '09, and the live album pulled from his three-night stint at the newly opened Citi Field in New York City, Good Evening New York City.

Tour band
 Paul McCartney: Lead Vocals, Bass, Piano, Acoustic Guitar, Electric Guitar, Ukulele, Mandolin
 Rusty Anderson: Backing Vocals, Electric Guitar, Acoustic Guitar
 Brian Ray: Backing Vocals, Electric Guitar, Acoustic Guitar, Bass
 Paul "Wix" Wickens: Backing Vocals, Keyboards, Electric Guitar, Percussion, Harmonica
 Abe Laboriel, Jr.: Backing Vocals, Drums, Percussion

Tour dates

Set list

Instruments played by band members

References

External links

2009 concert tours
Paul McCartney concert tours